Fatima-Zohra Oukazi (born January 18, 1984, in Chlef) is an Algerian international volleyball player and Algeria women's national volleyball team captain (2010-2012), playing as  setter. At club level she made her debut for GS Chlef, based in her home city of Chlef. She now plays for Algiers' based GS Petroliers.

Club information
Current club : 2007-current  GSP (ex MCA)

Debut club : 1998-2007  Ghalia Sportif de Chlef GSC

References

External links
 Profile at FIVB.org

1984 births
Living people
People from Chlef
Algerian women's volleyball players
Volleyball players at the 2008 Summer Olympics
Olympic volleyball players of Algeria
Competitors at the 2009 Mediterranean Games
Setters (volleyball)
Mediterranean Games competitors for Algeria
21st-century Algerian people